Justin John Yerbury  (born 3 May 1974) is an Australian molecular biologist who was spurred to follow a career in biological research when he discovered his family has the genetic form of motor neuron disease (MND). He holds the position of Professor in Neurodegenerative Disease at the University of Wollongong. He was diagnosed with MND himself  in 2016 but continues to research.

Education and career 
By his own admission, Yerbury "was not much of a scientist at school." He studied for a Bachelor of Commerce before playing professional basketball in the National Basketball League (NBL) for the Illawarra Hawks in 1995 and 1996 while helping to run the family business.

In the late 1990s members of Yerbury's extended family were diagnosed and died from motor neurone disease, also known as amyotrophic lateral sclerosis (ALS) or Lou Gehrig's disease. Ninety to ninety-five per cent of cases are considered sporadic, occurring randomly in the population. The remaining 5–10% of cases are familial (genetic) with one parent carrying the gene. Mutations of more than twelve genes have been found to cause the disease. Using genealogical information, Yerbury traced suspected cases of motor neuron disease in his family to at least 1920 and possibly further back. He was prompted to return to university studies to further understand the disease.

In 2004 Yerbury obtained a BSc with 1st class honours from the University of Wollongong. He received his PhD from the same university in 2008 for a thesis titled: Characterisation of novel extracellular molecular chaperones and their effects on amyloid formation. He worked as a research assistant, lecturer and research fellow during his studies. During 2008 and 2009 he was an Australian Research Council (ARC) International Linkage Fellow at the University of Cambridge, UK. Yerbury has been a Discovery Early Career Researcher Award (DECRA) Postdoctoral Fellow at the University of Wollongong since 2012. He has spent the last decade studying the disease which affects around 2000 Australians, alongside his team at the Illawarra Health and Medical Research Institute (IHMRI), based at the University of Wollongong. His team of young researchers will carry on his work.

Personal life 
Yerbury first knew of MND when his uncle was diagnosed in 1994. A cousin was diagnosed and died in 1997; he was 21 years old. During six-week period in 2002 his mother, grandmother and aunt died. Fifty per cent of Yerbury's family carry a faulty SOD-1 gene. His youngest sister died from MND at 26 years old. Yerbury and his sister, Naomi, were tested for the gene; Naomi was clear but Yerbury's test was positive.

Yerbury was diagnosed with MND in 2016. His condition stabilised at first but he now requires around-the-clock care and has a ventilator to allow him to breathe. He was initially denied a suitable wheelchair and house modifications under the National Disability Insurance Scheme (NDIS), sparking an online crowdfunding campaign. After coming to the attention of Federal Labor MP Sharon Bird, he was provided with an appropriate wheelchair and some home modifications under the scheme. Yerbury's public profile has also highlighted others who encountered difficulties with the NDIS. Yebury highlighted the difficulties MND patients encounter with the NDIS in an article in The Conversation in November 2018.

In January 2018 Yerbury's condition deteriorated significantly and he underwent a tracheostomy necessitating mandatory ventilation. To further facilitate his life support he also had a laryngectomy which means he is unable to speak. He now communicates by lip reading and using voice software coordinated by eye-gaze on his laptop computer. After this surgery Yerbury spent six months in hospital recovering with complications. In November 2018 he had returned home and began attending his office two days a week to continue his research.

In April 2017 Yerbury met Stephen Hawking, a world-famous physicist and cosmologist who had MND for over fifty years until his death in 2018. They discussed living with the disease and Yerbury's research.

Yerbury is married to Rachel Yerbury. They have two daughters born 1996, and 1998.

In March 2019 Yerbury, his family and carers were turned away from a planned cruise to New Caledonia because of a perceived "disability risk". After media attention the cruise company apologised to the family and refunded fees and costs.

In December 2019 QANTAS airlines co-operated with the Yerbury family to provide an appropriate hoist to enable him to travel by plane to Perth, WA for a family holiday and to enable Yerbury to present his current research at the 30th International Symposium on ALS/MND.

Research 
Yerbury is researching potential effective treatments for MND. His research interests include: protein misfolding, aggregation and neurodegenerative disease, protein aggregation and neuro-inflammation and the Propagation of protein misfolding, and protein homeostasis and Motor Neurone Disease. This video shows Yerbury demonstrating the role of protein folding in the progress of MND. His team studies single molecules of protein, grow cells and are carrying out some drug trials. He has been active in sharing his research not only with the academic community but also with those with MND and their families.

Yerbury has 55 research articles listed in PubMed and over 100 in Google Scholar in addition to many conference and other presentations.

Awards 
 The Australian Society for Medical Research Young Investigator Award, 2004
 Bill Gole Postdoctoral MND Research Fellowship, 2009
 Vice Chancellor's Emerging Researcher of the Year award, 2011
 Lorne Conference on Protein Structure and Function Young Investigator Prize, 2012
 MND Australia Betty Laidlaw MND Research Prize for 2017
Wollongong’s Citizen of the Year, Australia Day Awards 2019
 Member of the Order of Australia in the 2020 Australia Day Honours for "significant service to education and research in the field of biological sciences"
 University of New South Wales Eureka Prize for Scientific Research, 2022
 NSW Premier's Prizes for Science & Engineering: Excellence in Medical Biological Sciences, 2022

References

Australian men's basketball players
Australian biologists
1974 births
Living people
Academic staff of the University of Wollongong
Illawarra Hawks players
Members of the Order of Australia
People with motor neuron disease